One Columbus Center is a  highrise office building in Downtown Columbus, Ohio. The cornerstone for the building was laid on October 21, 1986, and it was completed the next year. NBBJ designed the building after the post-modern architectural style. One Columbus Center was constructed for $62 million and is the 11th tallest in Columbus. The staggered facade allows for 15 corner offices on every floor. It has 37,855 m² of floor space and sits on the former site of the Deshler Hotel.

See also
List of tallest buildings in Columbus

References

External links
 

Skyscraper office buildings in Columbus, Ohio
Buildings in downtown Columbus, Ohio
Office buildings completed in 1987
NBBJ buildings
1987 establishments in Ohio
Broad Street (Columbus, Ohio)
High Street (Columbus, Ohio)